Ichthyophis nigroflavus, the Kuala Lumpur caecilian, is a species of amphibian in the family Ichthyophiidae endemic to Malaysia. Its natural habitats are subtropical or tropical moist lowland forests, rivers, intermittent rivers, plantations, rural gardens, heavily degraded former forest, irrigated land, and seasonally flooded agricultural land.

References

Amphibians described in 1960
Amphibians of Malaysia
nigroflavus
Endemic fauna of Malaysia
Taxonomy articles created by Polbot